I Love My Dad is a 2022 American comedy film written and directed by James Morosini, inspired by actual events in his life. It stars Patton Oswalt, Morosini, and Claudia Sulewski. The film premiered at South by Southwest on March 12, 2022, and in theaters in the United States on August 5, 2022.

Premise
After Franklin blocks his father Chuck on social media, Chuck "catfishes" his son by impersonating a waitress named Becca online. Chuck then agrees to drive Franklin to Maine to meet Becca, knowing that it might be the last straw in their father-son relationship.

Cast
 Patton Oswalt as Chuck
 James Morosini as Franklin
 Claudia Sulewski as Becca
 Rachel Dratch as Erica
 Ricky Velez as Derek
 Lil Rel Howery as Jimmy
 Amy Landecker as Diane

Production 
Principal photography took place in Syracuse, New York. Filming wrapped in June 2021.

Release
The film premiered at South by Southwest on March 12, 2022. In April 2022, Magnolia Pictures acquired the film's distribution rights. It was released in theaters on August 5, 2022, and on demand on August 12, 2022.

Reception

Critical response
 

Todd McCarthy at Deadline Hollywood praised Oswalt's performance, Morosini's screenplay, and the use of social media to refine the show, don't tell technique. The Hollywood Reporters John DeFore gave positive notes to Morosini's direction and called it "a surprisingly gentle take on a potentially explosive premise." Nick Allen at RogerEbert.com gave it a 3.5/4 and praised Sulewski as the movie's "comic MVP", adding that she "plays into both 'Becca' exaggerations so thoughtfully, that by the third act her actual Becca has a special poignancy and agency." David Ehrlich at IndieWire gave it a B-, praising Morosini for "keeping the perversity of it all intact" and Sulewski's performance to be "elastic", while adding that it would have "been a more satisfying experience had it swerved away from decency and good taste even harder than it already does[...]"

Accolades
At the South by Southwest film festival, the film won the Jury and Audience Awards in the Narrative Feature Competition.

References

External links
 

2022 films
2022 comedy films
American comedy films
Films shot in New York (state)
2020s English-language films
Films about social media
2020s American films